The Scotian was a named Canadian passenger train service that ran between Montreal, Quebec, and Halifax, Nova Scotia, and was operated by Canadian National Railways and later Via Rail Canada. The Scotian's inaugural run was March 16, 1941.

Whereas the Ocean Limited, which ran the same route, was an express train with few stops (as the "limited" name suggested) the Scotian serviced many more communities between the two cities.

History

Discontinuance

In 1978, Via Rail took control of CN passenger service and began negotiations with Canadian Pacific Railway to obtain their passenger service. The takeover was complete by the summer of 1979. The decision was made to discontinue the Scotian and replace it with the Atlantic which Canadian Pacific routed through the United States. The Atlantic used the original train numbers (11 and 12) of the Scotian.

Via Rail also added two new trains to supplement the Ocean with local service on parts of the Scotian's former route. Le Saint-Laurent (trains 18 and 19) ran between Montreal and Mont-Joli, Quebec, while Rail Diesel Car service (trains 617 and 618) ran between Campbellton and Moncton, New Brunswick.

References

External links
1954 schedule and consist at Streamliner Schedules

Scotian
Scotian
Scotian
Scotian
Scotian
Scotian
1941 establishments in Canada
Scotian